The 2009 World Youth Championships in Athletics is the sixth edition of the IAAF World Youth Championships in Athletics.  They were held at Brixen-Bressanone Sport Arena in Bressanone, Italy from 8–12 July 2009.  Athletes had to be aged 16 or 17 on 31 December 2009 (born in 1992 or 1993) to compete.

15-year-old Jodie Williams took the 100 m sprint title in a youth world leading time of 11.39.  This was also a personal best for Williams, who had not lost a 100 m final since 2007. Also winning the girls' 200 m, Williams became the first youth athlete ever to do so. A similar feat was achieved by Kirani James of Grenada, who won the boys' 200 and 400 metres.

In winning the long jump, Supanara Sukhasvasti became Thailand's first finalist, medallist and champion in an athletics global event of any age category.  He is a descendant of King Rama IV. With the 100 m hurdles, 17-year-old Isabelle Pedersen became Norway's first World Youth champion.  Her time of 13.20 in the semi finals was a national record and third all-time Youth best. 16-year-old Italian Alessia Trost also became the host nation's first World Youth champion.

Johan Rogestedt of Sweden became the first European ever to win the 800 metres, usually dominated by East African runners. In high jump, Russian-born Dmitriy Kroyter became Israel's first world youth champion.

Medal summary

Boys

Girls

Medals table

All Information taken from IAAF's website.

References

External links
 Official results
Official website of the 2009 World Youth Championships

 
IAAF World Youth Championships in Athletics
World Youth Championships in Athletics
Athletics
International athletics competitions hosted by Italy
Brixen